Las Piñas, officially the City of Las Piñas, is a 1st class highly urbanized city in the National Capital Region of the Philippines. According to the 2020 census, it has a population of 606,293 people.

Las Piñas was sixth in MoneySense Philippines "Best Places To Live" report in 2008. Attractions include Evia Lifestyle Center, SM Southmall, Robinsons Place Las Piñas and Las Piñas - Parañaque Wetland Park.

History

Early history

Las Piñas was one of the earliest fishing settlements on the shores of Manila Bay. It was proclaimed as a province of Manila either in 1762 or 1797. Agustin, a Spanish historian, and Fr. Juan de Medina placed it at 1762. Las Piñas was formerly called "Las Pilas" due to its separation from Parañaque due to tribal conflicts. On the other hand, Manuel Buzeta recorded the date at 1797. Felix Timbang was the first gobernadorcillo in 1762, while Mariano Ortiz was the first municipal president of the town of Las Piñas.

Las Piňas is famous for its Bamboo Organ, which was built by Fr. Diego Cera and completed in 1824. In 1880, the city experienced an outbreak of cholera and smallpox leading to the loss of many lives. Years later, Las Piňas also became a central battleground between Spanish and Philippine forces during the Philippine Revolution.

The town of Las Piñas was also a major war theater during the 1896 Philippine Revolution, as it was occupied by forces of General Emilio Aguinaldo. In 1901, the municipality of Las Piñas, previously a part of the province of Manila, was incorporated to the newly created province of Rizal pursuant to the Philippine Commission Act No. 137. On October 12, 1903, in accordance with Act No. 942, it was combined with the town of Parañaque, with the latter as the seat of a new municipal government.

It was separated from Parañaque to become an independent municipality again on March 27, 1907, by virtue of Philippine Commission Act No. 1625. The town was occupied by the Japanese during World War II and liberated by the combined American and Filipino forces. On November 7, 1975, through Presidential Decree No. 824, Las Piñas was excised from the province of Rizal to form Metro Manila. Las Piñas became one of the municipalities making up the region.

Etymology
The story about the true origin of the city's name, "Las Piñas", varies. One version mentioned, that traders from the province of Cavite and Batangas shipped their first piñas (Spanish for pineapples) for sale to this town before they were distributed to nearby markets. Another version related that it was "Las Peñas" (the rocks), evident by the quarrying of stones and adobe which were used to construct buildings and bridges. The old church bell from St. Joseph Parish Church founded by Diego Cera has been preserved inside the church museum. An inscription on the bell states, "Siendo cura del pueblo de Laspeñas el M.R.P. Padre Diego Cera se fundió este equilón año de 1820," showing that even during the time of Diego Cera, the town's first parish priest, the town was called "Las Peñas", for some time and eventually was renamed "Las Piñas".

Contemporary history
In the 1980s, economic growth erupted due to the advent of the construction of Coastal Road. Las Piñas currently serves as the proper gateway to Calabarzon.

In the 1990s, Las Piñas was known for its rampant illegal drug trade. In an October 1989 privileged speech, Senator Ernesto F. Herrera shared the National Bureau of Investigation's findings that an estimated 40% of Las Piñas' police force was connected with a drug cartel. In 1995, then-Councilor Yoyoy Villame criticized the town's image as the "Drug Capital of the Philippines", while NCR Command Director Job Mayo alleged upon his appointment in early 1996 that the town's police force had the most drug-dependent police officers in the metropolis.

Cityhood

On February 12, 1997, President Fidel V. Ramos signed the bill which elevated Las Piñas from municipality into a city. A plebiscite held a month after approved the city status by its residents, and Las Piñas became the 10th city of Metro Manila on March 26, 1997.

Geography
Las Piñas is bounded to the northeast by Parañaque; to the southeast by Muntinlupa; to the west by Bacoor; to the southwest by Dasmariñas; and to the northwest by Manila Bay. Half of its land area is residential and the remaining half is used for commercial, industrial and institutional purposes. The present physiography of Las Piñas consists of three zones: Manila Bay, coastal margin and the Guadalupe Plateau.

Climate

Districts and barangays
Las Piñas is politically subdivided into 20 barangays. These barangays are grouped into two legislative districts, each with its own set of representatives in the city council. District 1 comprises the northwestern half of the city while District 2, the remaining half.

Demographics

Language
The native language of Las Piñas is Tagalog, but the majority of the residents understand and speak English.

Religion

People in Las Piñas are mainly Roman Catholic. Catholic churches in Las Piñas fall under the jurisdiction of the Diocese of Parañaque

Other religions in Las Piñas includes various Protestant denominations, Jehovah's Witnesses, Iglesia ni Cristo, The Church of Jesus Christ of Latter-day Saints, Hinduism, Buddhism and Islam.

Economy

Government

Local government
Las Piñas, like other cities of the Philippines, is a local government unit whose powers and functions are specified by the Local Government Code of the Philippines. In general, as a city, Las Piñas is headed by a mayor who heads the city's executive function and the vice mayor who heads the city's legislative function, which is composed of twelve councilors, six each from the city's two city council districts. For representation, the city is considered as one district, and therefore one representative, in the country's House of Representatives.

Additionally, like other cities and municipalities, Las Piñas is subdivided into barangays.

List of mayors

Education
There are a total of 14 colleges, 20 private high schools, 18 public high schools, and 22 elementary schools that were built to accommodate the growing number of the enrollees every year.

To date, there are 77 day care centers with feeding programs in 20 barangays within Las Piñas.

Colleges
ABE – Las Piñas Campus
Bernardo College
Centro Escolar Las Piñas
Don Carlo Cavina School
Dr. Filemon C. Aguilar Memorial College of Las Piñas-Talon Tres Campus, a local college that offers Bachelor's degree in Accountancy and Business Administration (with majors in Marketing Management, Financial Management, and Human Resource Development Management).
Dr. Filemon C. Aguilar Memorial College of Las Piñas-Pamplona Tres Campus (formerly Dr. Filemon C. Aguilar Information Technology Training Institute or DFCAITTI), a local college that offers diploma courses like Computer Programming, Visual Graphics Design, and Animations. It also offers Bachelor's degrees in Information System and Computer Engineering.
Philippine Merchant Marine School – Las Piñas Campus (Main)
AMA Computer College, Las Piñas
STI College, Las Piñas
Saint Francis of Assisi College
Southville International School and Colleges
University of Perpetual Help System DALTA
APEC Schools Las Piñas
International Electronics and Technical Institute (IETI) - Las Piñas

Public high schools
Las Piñas City National Science High School
Las Piñas National High School - Almanza Uno
Las Piñas East National High School - Verdant
Equitable Village National High School (formerly Las Piñas East National High School - Equitable Village Annex II)
Talon Village National High School (formerly Las Piñas East National High School - Talon Village Annex II)
Las Piñas North National High School- Vergonville Subd., PulanLupa Dos
Las Piñas National High School – Gatchalian Annnex
Las Piñas City Technical-Vocational High School (formerly Rizal Experimental Station and Pilot School of Cottage Industries – Las Piñas)
Las Piñas City National Senior High School – Doña Josefa Campus
Las Piñas City National Senior High School – Talon Dos Campus
Las Piñas City National Senior High School – CAA Campus
Las Piñas City National Senior High School – Manuyo Campus
Las Piñas National High School – Senior High School
CAA National High School - Main
CAA National High School – Annex
Golden Acres National High School
Las Piñas North National High School
Lydia Aguilar National High School (T.S. Cruz High School)

Private high schools
Academy of Jesus
Almanza Baptist Christian Academy
Augustinian Abbey School
Blessed Trinity School of Las Piñas
Bloomfield Academy Center for Science and Technology
Camella Homes Montessori Child Development Center
Camella School INC
Centro Escolar Las Piñas
Don Carlo Cavina School
Divine Light Academy
Holy Rosary Academy of Las Piñas City
Saint Joseph's Academy
St. Rose of Lima (Las Piñas) School Inc.
St. Michael's School, Inc.
Sto. Niño De Eucharistia Academy
St. Therese School 
Schola de Vita, Inc.
Southville International School and Colleges
Elizabeth Seton School
Westfield Science-Oriented School and Colleges https://www.wsos.edu.ph 
APEC Schools (Affordable Private Education Center) https://www.apecschools.edu.ph/
Father Angelico Lipani School- Annex
Merry Treasure School
Mary Immaculate Parish Special School
Operation Brotherhood Montessori Center
Montessori De Manila

Grades K to 12

Bloomfield Academy Center for Science and Technology
Sto. Niño De Eucharistia Academy
Blessed Trinity School of Las Piñas
Holy Rosary Academy

Public Elementary Schools

Almanza Elementary School 
CAA Elementary School - Main
CAA Elementary School - Annex
Daniel Fajardo Elementary School
Doña Manuela Elementary School
Gatchalian Elementary School
Ilaya Elementary School
Las Piñas Elementary School Central
Manuyo Elementary School
Moonwalk Elementary School 
Moonwalk Elementary School - Golden Acres Annex
Moonwalk Elementary School - Mikesell Annex
Pamplona Elementary School Central
Pamplona Elementary School - Unit I
Pilar Village Elementary School
Pulanlgupa Elementary School
Pulanglupa Elementary School - Camella Annex
Talon Elementary School
Talon Tres Elementary School
T.S. Cruz Elementary School
Vergonville Elementary School
Zapote Elementary School

Healthcare

Transportation

Railway
Las Piñas is part of the route of the extension of the LRT Line 1, the South Extension Project. The actual construction officially started on Tuesday, May 7, 2019 because the Right-of-way is "free and clear" from obstructions. Once it is fully operational, Las Piñas will be served by the LRT Line 1 through the Las Piñas station and Zapote station. The extension is slated for partial operations by late 2024 or early 2025 and full operations by second quarter of 2027.

Road network

The road network of Las Piñas are radial in nature, and primarily relies on the Alabang–Zapote Road (N411), which serves as the city's road network backbone. The Manila-Cavite Expressway (formerly Coastal Road, and numbered E3), a toll expressway serves as the major traffic route towards Manila. Daang Hari, which hugs near the boundary with Muntinlupa, and the Aguinaldo Highway (N62) are the major traffic routes toward Cavite. The Muntinlupa-Cavite Expressway (MCX), that leads to South Luzon Expressway, supplements Daang Hari as an alternate to the congested Alabang-Zapote Road over Alabang and Ayala Alabang in Muntinlupa.

The road network in Las Piñas suffers from traffic jams, especially on the primary artery, Alabang-Zapote Road, which carried more than 70,000 vehicles daily as of 2016. Public transport, like buses and jeepneys, fill up Alabang-Zapote Road, therefore causing further congestion. The city government petitioned the Land Transportation Franchising and Regulatory Board (LTFRB) to suspend issuing of franchises on bus and jeepneys routes that uses Alabang-Zapote Road.

The Las Piñas Friendship Route network serves as the alternate routes on the congested routes, but motorists have to obtain and display a sticker on their vehicle to use these routes, as most roads of the network are located in privately owned subdivisions (gated communities), like BF Homes, Pilar Village, and BF Resort.

Public transport
Jeepneys and buses form the major public transport system, and most of their routes follow the Alabang-Zapote Road. Most jeepneys through Las Piñas travel between Alabang and Zapote, within the city, or Baclaran, in Parañaque. Buses usually form routes between Alabang or SM Southmall and destinations in Manila. Buses and jeepneys are blamed for the worsening congestion on Alabang-Zapote Road.

Culture

On February 22, 1995, then President Fidel V. Ramos signed Republic Act 8003 into a law – declaring Las Piñas Church and Bamboo Organ, Las Piñas Bridge, Asinan Area, Father Diego Cera Bridge, and Old District Hospital as tourist spots of Las Piñas.

Las Piñas is famous for its Bamboo Organ located inside the St. Joseph Parish Church in the old district of the city. Built in 1824 by a Catholic priest, Fr. Diego Cera, it is the only organ of its kind in the world with organ pipes mostly made out of bamboo.

Las Piñas Historical Corridor Project
The Las Piñas Historical Corridor Project was a program laid to restore the Old Town of Las Piñas. It was launched at the Malacañan Heroes' Hall on November 13, 1997. The project aims to educate the people of Las Piñas along the tourist corridor. 19 structures were included along the historical corridor:

Boundary Arc
Bulwagang Ezekiel Moreno
Santuario de San Ezekiel Moreno
Police and Fire Station
Public Library
Plaza Quezon – designated as the Freedom Park in the City of Las Piñas by City Ordinance No. 700-06, Series of 2006. This was in accordance with Section 15 of Batas Pambansa Blg. 880, otherwise known as the "Public Assembly Act of 1985".
Central Elementary School
E. Aldana Police Station
Fr. Diego Cera Bridge
Historical and Cultural Museum
Las Piñas Fish Port
Irasan Center
Las Piñas Manpower Youth Council – TESDA Building
Zapote Police Station
Las Piñas General Hospital and Satellite Trauma Center
Zapote Bridge
Barangay Hall of Zapote
Centennial Flyover
Molino Dam

Las Piñas Town Fiesta
The town fiesta of Las Piñas is celebrated every first Sunday of May each year to honor its patron saint, Saint Joseph. Saint Joseph's Day celebration is centered in St. Joseph Parish Church in the old poblacion of Las Piñas in Barangay Daniel Fajardo on Padre Diego Cera Ave. (Quirino Ave.). Las Piñas was also the home of Mary Immaculate Parish Church, popularly known as the Nature Church, designed by Architect Francisco "Bobby" Mañosa.

Las Piñas is also home to unique festivals such as:

International Bamboo Organ Festival – a music festival held in February celebrating the music of the unique Bamboo Organ with performances by local and foreign classical artists
Waterlily Festival – every July 27
"Parol" or Lantern Festival – celebrated during Christmas season
Las Piñas Historical Festival – celebrated every March to commemorate significant historical events that happened in the city

List of cultural properties of Las Piñas

|}

Notable personalities

Amani Aguinaldo, UFL football player, member of Philippine Azkals
 Quest, r&b singer
Rodjun Cruz, actor and dancer
Rayver Cruz, actor and host
Kevin Alas, PBA basketball player, member of Gilas Pilipinas and NLEX Road Warriors
Zara Aldana or Zephorah Aldana Mayon, Mutya ng Pilipinas 2007 Asia Pacific International and former housemate of Pinoy Big Brother: Celebrity Edition 2
Raymond Bagatsing, actor
McNeal (Awra) Briguela, child actor as seen on Ang Probinsyano
Ely Buendia, songwriter, vocalist and guitarist of Eraserheads, Pupil, Oktaves and Apartel
Sef Cadayona, actor and dancer
Tirso Cruz III, actor
Jen Da Silva, model, dancer as part of the 26K girls of Kapamilya, Deal or No Deal and former housemate of Pinoy Big Brother: Celebrity Edition 2
Ranidel de Ocampo, PBA basketball player, member of Gilas Pilipinas and TNT KaTropa
Mr. Fu, radio jock, comedian and host
Michelle Gavagan, Miss Philippines Fire 2011
Enrique Gil, artist of ABS-CBN
Nikki Gil, singer, actress, TV host and former MYX VJ
Ruben Gonzaga, comedian and winner of Pinoy Big Brother: Celebrity Edition 2
Allan K., co-host of Eat Bulaga
Pauleen Luna, actress
Pol Medina Jr., author of Pugad Baboy
Jennylyn Mercado, actress and singer
Iwa Moto, actress
Sitti Navarro, bossa nova singer
Amy Perez, actress, host and radio anchor
Kai Sotto, Member of Philippines Men's Basketball Team Gilas Pilipinas
Zack Tabudlo, singer-songwriter
 Ronald Allen "Beware" Salanga, Member of the rap group Death Threat (hip hop group)

Sister cities

Local
Parañaque, Metro Manila
Muntinlupa, Metro Manila
Pasay, Metro Manila
Bacoor, Cavite
Samal, Davao del Norte

See also
Battle of Zapote Bridge
Las Piñas Boys Choir

References

External links

[ Philippine Standard Geographic Code]
International Bamboo Organ Festival

Barangay Daniel Fajardo

 
Cities in Metro Manila
Highly urbanized cities in the Philippines
Populated places established in 1907
Populated places on Manila Bay
1907 establishments in the Philippines